An eyelash is a hair on the eyelid.

Eyelash may also refer to:

Eyelash boa, a boa species
Eyelash Gecko, a gecko species
Eyelash cup, a species of fungus
Eyelash mite, a parasite
Eyelash viper, a type of snake
Eyelash yarn, a type of yarn
Eyelashes (One Piece), a character from One Piece